Hanson and the Beast is a 2017 Chinese fantasy comedy film starring Feng Shaofeng and Liu Yifei.

Plot
Yuan Shuai, a debt-ridden animal-breeder, tries to get out of his financial predicament by finding a wealthy girlfriend through matchmaking dates. He unexpectedly meets and falls in love with a fox demon, Bai Xianchu, who he saved as a child. However, the head of the Demon tribe Yun Zhonghe forbids love relationships between demons and humans, so he takes Bai Xianchu away. To seek his lover, Yuan Shuai bravely crashes into the demonic world.

Cast
 Feng Shaofeng as Yuan Shuai/Hansen - a lonely man who owes a group of thugs a large sum of money due to his movie being unsuccessful. He is thus forced to work and live at a zoo, while in the meantime attempting to find a rich woman to help settle his debt. He later falls in love with Bai Xianchu, but she is forcefully taken away by the Bureau of Transfiguration.  Yuan Shuai realizes that she is everything to him, so he courageously goes to her rescue.
 Liu Yifei as Bai Xianchu - a Arctic Silver Fox demon. Her dealings with Hansen lead her into a lot of trouble with the Bureau of Transfiguration, as marrying a human is considered severe felony in the demon world. She loves Yuan Shuai dearly and is willing to sacrifice anything for him.  
 Li Guanjie as Yun Zhonghe - Commissioner of the Bureau of Transfiguration. He's the main antagonist. 
 Guo Jingfei as Hong Sicong - Chief of Human World Branch of the Bureau of Transfiguration.

References

External links
 
 

2017 films
Chinese fantasy comedy films
2010s fantasy comedy films
2017 comedy films